James Henry Lyons (October 9, 1889 – February 8, 1961) was a baseball player in the Negro leagues. He pitched and played outfield between 1910 and 1925. He played for the Brooklyn Royal Giants, Chicago Giants, Lincoln Giants, St. Louis Giants, and Detroit Stars. He is the brother of Bennie Lyons, another baseball player who played for the West Baden Sprudels and Indianapolis ABCs.

When the Negro National League formed in 1920, Lyons signed himself to the Detroit Stars. He played there for one year, then went back to play for the Chicago American Giants.

While many baseball researchers list Lyons as a right-handed hitter or even a right-handed thrower, most newspaper accounts show he was a southpaw.

Lyons served in the military during World War I.

Death
Lyons died in Chicago on February 8, 1961.

References

External links
 and Baseball-Reference Black Baseball stats and Seamheads

Sportspeople from Chicago
1880s births
1963 deaths
Brooklyn Royal Giants players
Lincoln Giants players
Louisville Black Caps players
Chicago American Giants players
Bacharach Giants players
Indianapolis ABCs players
St. Louis Giants players
Detroit Stars players
Baseball players from Chicago
American military personnel of World War I
Baseball pitchers
Negro league baseball managers
African-American baseball managers
Player-coaches
African Americans in World War I
Baseball players from Indianapolis